New Chamber Opera is a professional opera company located in Oxford, United Kingdom. It specialises in the fields of chamber opera and music theatre, and produces rarely performed works from the Baroque era to the present. It is a member of the Opera and Music Theatre Forum.  New Chamber Opera has received financial support from the Arts Council of Great Britain and The National Lottery.

History 
New Chamber Opera was founded in 1990 by Michael Burden and Gary Cooper. Burden serves as its director.
The company has staged more than thirty productions, including Handel's Orlando, Serse and Amadigi di Gaula, Cimarosa's The Secret Marriage and Mozart's The Marriage of Figaro and Il Rè pastore. The company has an associated Baroque orchestra, The Band of Instruments.

Appearances outside Oxford have included concerts and productions at the Tudeley and Southwark Festivals, several performances at London's South Bank Centre, and at the National Gallery. With its contemporary music ensemble Phoenix, it has performed several pieces of twentieth-century music theatre including Schoenberg's Pierrot Lunaire, Peter Maxwell Davies's Eight Songs for a Mad King, Vessalii Icones, Notre Dames des Fleurs, and Miss Donnithorne's Maggot, and Harrison Birtwistle's Down by the Greenwood Side.

New Chamber Opera has frequently recovered and performed lesser known works, particularly those of the 17th, 18th, and early 19th centuries. To this end its members have prepared new editions and commissioned new translations. In 2008 and 2009, New Chamber Opera took part in a national fundraising campaign led by the Bodleian Library, Oxford, to prevent the only known manuscript of the English version of Francesco Cavalli's opera, Erismena, from being exported to the United States. New Chamber Opera subsequently staged the opera using a new edition by Michael Burden, and toured the production to the Opera at West Green House. 
 
Its music director is Steven Devine, and its singing patron is James Bowman.

Activities 

The focus of the company's professional activities is the Summer Opera, an annual garden staging in the Warden's Garden at New College. The garden, a natural theatrical space surrounded by stone walls with an 18th-century stone summer house, is located between Queen's Lane and All Souls College.

The Band of Instruments, founded by Michael Burden and Gary Cooper in 1995, first performed with the Choir of New College, Oxford. In 2014 the Band's musical director is Roger Hamilton, and its leader is Caroline Balding.

Recordings 

New Chamber Opera's recordings have mostly appeared on the Gaudeamus label, with Academy Sound and Vision. These include music by Purcell from the Gresham Manuscript, and Music for Ceremonial Oxford. It has frequently recorded French Baroque music, recording stage music from Charpentier's output, and the only complete recording of Rameau's cantatas.

The Band of Instruments have also recorded the cycle of the four seasons concertos by the Italian composer Giovanni Antonio Guido, Scherzi armonici sopra le quattro stagioni dell’anno (‘Harmonics above the four seasons of the year’). Guido, who was serving as maître de la musique for the Duke of Orléans, had been living and working in France from about 1703. KLassik.com commented that ‘Caroline Balding, Matthew Truscott and Sarah Moffatt play perfectly synchronized in timbre and expression’, while CD Classico Italy described it as ‘a fine and authentic execution by the violinist Caroline Balding’.

New Chamber Opera Studio 

The company also operates the New Chamber Opera Studio, which stages two student productions annually and a recital series of twenty-four concerts in which they take part.  Recent productions have included Orpheus in the Underworld, by Offenbach, in 2012 and La Calisto, by Francesco Cavalli, in 2014

In 2016, the company gave the world premiere of "Rothschild's Violin" by Marco Galvani in the antechapel of Oxford's New College.

The members of New Chamber Opera Studio also prepare or organise the live content of the University's visiting chairs of opera. The visiting professors have included Thomas Allen, Graham Vick, John Eliot Gardiner, Renée Fleming, Jane Glover, and Katie Mitchell.

New Chamber Opera also part-funds two Repetiteur Scholarships every three years to St Catherine's College, Oxford. The award has recently been held by:

 Alice Newton
 Jonathon Swinard https://www.jonathonswinard.com/
 Benjamin Holder http://benjaminholdermusic.com/
 Harry Sever https://www.harrysever.com/
 Edmund Whitehead https://www.edmundwhitehead.com/
 Michael Pandya https://www.michaelpandya.com/
 Naomi Orrell
 Chloe Rooke https://www.chloerooke.com/
 Anhad Arora
 Joseph Beesley
 Toby Stanford

Productions 
This list of productions follows the information in the company's website.

New Chamber Opera
 Le astuzie femminili, Cimarosa, 2022 
 La diavolessa, Galuppi, 2021 
 The COVID-19 Year
 Il pastor fido, Handel, 2019
 Il mondo della luna, Haydn, 2018 (new version by Michael Burden and Luke Lewis and a new translation by Simon Rees)
 Il barbiere di Siviglia, Paisiello, 2017
 The Parisian Painter, Cimarosa, 2016 (new edition by Michael Burden and Luke Lewis and a new translation by Simon Rees)
 La Locandiera, Salieri, 2015
 L'infedeltà delusa, Haydn, 2014
 Tamerlano, Handel, 2013
 Il re pastore, Mozart, 2012
 Falstaff, Antonio Salieri, 2011
 Erismena, Cavalli, 2010 (new edition by Michael Burden, and on tour to West Green Opera)
 , Baldassare Galuppi, 2009 (newly commissioned translation by Simon Rees and edition by Michael Burden)
 Don't Go Down the Elephant After Midnight, Andrew Gant, 2008 (World premiere, Tête-à-Tête Opera Festival at the Hammersmith Studios)
 Artaxerxes, Thomas Arne, 2008
 Serse, Handel, 2007 (revival) 
 La canterina, Haydn, 2006 
 Le comte Ory, Rossini, 2006
 La finta semplice, Mozart, 2005 (newly commissioned translation by Simon Rees, and edition by Michael Burden)
 The Medium, Peter Maxwell Davies, 2005 (performed for Maxwell Davies's election as an Honorary Doctor of Music by the University of Oxford)
 Il Trespolo tutore, Alessandro Stradella, 2004 (newly commissioned translation by Simon Rees, and edition by Michael Burden)
 La finta giardiniera, Mozart, 2003
 Dido and Aeneas, Purcell, 2002 (new production)
 The Bear, William Walton, 2002 (to mark the Walton Centenary)
 Amadigi, Handel, 2001
 The Marriage of Figaro, Mozart, 2000 
 The Turn of the Screw, Britten, 1999
 Serse, Handel, 1998
 Così fan tutte, Mozart, 1997
 The Secret Marriage, Domenico Cimarosa, 1996 (new production) 
 Orlando, Handel, 1995 (revival)
 Dido and Aeneas, Purcell, 1995 (new production, and on tour to the Tudeley Festival) 
 Orlando, Handel, 1994
 Lo frate 'nnamorato, Pergolesi, 1993
 The Secret Marriage, Domenico Cimarosa, 1991
 Dido and Aeneas, Purcell, 1990

New Chamber Opera Studio

Recordings 
 Purcell Anthems, music by Henry Purcell, 1995, CRD with the Choir of New College, Oxford
 The Music to Le mariage forcé and Les Fous divertissants, music by Marc-Antione Charpentier, 1996, ASV
Songs and Music from the Gresham Autograph, music by Henry Purcell, 1999, ASV
 Rameau: Collected Cantatas, music by Jean-Philippe Rameau, 1999, ASV CDGAU632 (reviewed in the New York Times)
 Music from Ceremonial Oxford, music by Richard Goodson, Matthew Locke, Sampson Eastwick, John Blow, Henry Aldrich, 2001, ASV CDGAU222
 Andromède and Le ballet de Polieucte, music by Marc-Antoine Charpentier, 2002, ASV CDGAU303
 Vivaldi Cantatas: music by Antonio Vivaldi, 2004, ASV CDGAU339
 Guido The Four Seasons: music by Giovanni Antonio Guido, 2013, Divine Art B00AQZU9XW

External links
 New Chamber Opera website

References 

British opera companies
Musical groups established in 1990
Culture in Oxford